David William Rohde (born June 4, 1944) is an American political scientist and the Ernestine Friedl Professor of Political Science in the Trinity College of Arts and Sciences at Duke University. He has researched various aspects of American politics, including the Supreme Court and Congress. Before joining the faculty at Duke, he taught at Michigan State University (MSU) from 1970 to 2005.  At MSU, he started the program "Political Institutions and Public Choice", which focused on encouraging collaborative research between faculty members and students. He started the same program at Duke when he joined their faculty in July 2005. He was the editor-in-chief of the American Journal of Political Science from 1988 to 1990.

Honors and awards
In 2000, Rohde was elected to the American Academy of Arts and Sciences. In 2010, he received the Samuel Eldersveld Career Achievement Award from the Political Organizations and Parties Section of the American Political Science Association.

References

External links
Faculty page

Living people
1944 births
Scientists from Buffalo, New York
Duke University faculty
American political scientists
Canisius College alumni
University of Rochester alumni
Fellows of the American Academy of Arts and Sciences
Political science journal editors
Michigan State University faculty
20th-century American scientists
20th-century social scientists
21st-century American scientists
21st-century social scientists